Annabel "Annie" Simpson (born 6 June 1990) is a British racing cyclist, who rides for British amateur team Brother UK–Tifosi p/b OnForm, on the road and Hope Technology in cross-country and mountain biking.

See also
 List of 2016 UCI Women's Teams and riders

References

External links
 

1990 births
Living people
British female cyclists
Place of birth missing (living people)
21st-century British women